The 2019 South Asian Games, officially the XIII South Asian Games, was a major multi-sport event which was originally slated to be held from 9 to 18 March 2019 in Kathmandu and Pokhara, Nepal. However, the dates were postponed and the event was held from 1–10 December 2019, coincidentally at the same time as the 2019 Southeast Asian Games in the Philippines. The new dates were confirmed at the South Asian Olympic Council Executive Board meeting in Bangkok on 1 March 2019. The Dasarath Stadium hosted the opening ceremony along with the men's football tournament, with the stadium's renovation after the 2015 earthquake completed in under 10 months with an increased capacity of 20,000, along with the closing ceremony on 10 December.

Venues
Three different cities in Nepal hosted the competition: Kathmandu, Pokhara and Janakpur.

Kathmandu

Pokhara

Janakpur

Logo and mascot 

On 13 May 2019, the Ministry of Youth and Sports of Nepal unveiled the logo and mascot of the 13th South Asian Games. The ministry along with the Nepal Olympic Committee revealed a pair of blackbucks (Krishnashar) as the official mascot for the 2019 South Asian Games. Blackbucks are the only extant member of the genus Antelope and mostly found in the southern region of Nepal and is an endangered species with in Nepal.

The committee also revealed the official logo of the Games, a flying pigeon that embodies the vibrant colour of the logo of South Asia Olympic Council. It also includes world heritage sites and mountains of Nepal in the background.

The Games

Participating nations 
Seven countries competed. For the first time since 1999, Afghanistan did not compete at the South Asian Games, after leaving the South Asia Olympic Council in 2016. A total of 2,715 athletes competed.

Sports
These Games featured 26 sports with cricket returning after 8 years. Golf and karate were the two sports added by the hosts as their choice. All events must include a minimum of four participating teams otherwise it will not be held. Paragliding, which was scheduled to debut, was removed, as only two nations (Nepal and Pakistan) had registered competitors.

 
 
 
 
 
 
 
 Mountain biking (4)
 Road (4)
 
 
 
 
 
 
 
 
 
 
 
 
 
 
 
 Duathlon (2)
 Triathlon (3)
 Volleyball

Calendar

Records 
On 2 December 2019, Nepal women cricketer Anjali Chand created history by registering best bowling figures in any international Twenty20 match. She took 6 wickets for 0 runs while playing against Maldives. 
On 3 December 2019, Indian shooter Mehuli Ghosh clinched the 10m air rifle gold with a score of 253.3 in the final. Though her score, which is 0.4 more than the current world record of 252.9, created by another Indian shooter Apurvi Chandela is not recognised by the international body ISSF but is the Games record.
Indian high jumper Sarvesh Anil Kushare created Games record in the final of the high jump event. He jumped a height of 2.21 meter breaking 2.20 meters set by Sri Lankan athlete Manjula Kumara at the 2004 edition.
On 5 December 2019, Karthik Unnikrishnan of India broke the previous Games' Triple jump record of 16.45 metres set by Indian Renjith Maheshwary in the previous edition. He jumped a distance of 16.47 metres to win the gold medal. 
On 6 December 2019, 2018 Asian Games champion, Tejinder Pal Singh set a new Games record in Shot put. He threw the shot at a distance of 20.03 metres breaking previous record of 19.15 metres set by another Indian athlete Bahadur Singh Sagoo in the 1999 edition. On the same day, Sri Lankan men's 4x100 m relay team consisting of Himasha Eashan, Chanuka Sandeepa, Vinoj De Silva, Yupun Priyadarshana, set a new Games record, timing 39.14 secs bettering 39.91 secs previously set by Indian team in the 2004 edition.
On 7 December 2019, Pakistani athlete Arshad Nadeem created a new Games record in Javelin throw. He threw a distance of 86.23 metres bettering previous distance of 83.23 metres by India.

Medal table
As of 10 December 2019

As of 13 July 2021 (After the Doping Results)

Broadcasting rights 
Organizer of 2019 South Asian Games, Nepal Olympic Committee (NOC), sold the broadcast rights to A company, NK Media Ventures Pvt Ltd who ensured that the event will be available live in more than 15 channels across South Asia. In Nepal, following channel purchased broadcasting rights from NK Media Ventures.
 Nepal Television
 AP1 TV
 Action Sports channel

Doping at the 2019 South Asian Games 
150 random athletes participating in SAG 2019 were tested for Prohibited substances and the test samples were sent to WADA (World Anti-Doping Agency)- accredited laboratory in Qatar by SAG Anti Doping Organizing Committee. 3 Athletes had failed the Doping Test. They appealed against the result of the test ; they were given another chance to get a fair test and were called off with B-samples. The test held in the same laboratory and they had failed the test again. They were banned for four years until 2 December 2023.

"As per the international norms of athletics, the trio will be stripped of their medals and the athletes finishing just behind them will be given their medals," said RK Bista, International Technical Officers of Athletes.

References

External links

 
South Asian Games
2019 in Nepalese sport
South Asian Games
International sports competitions hosted by Nepal
Multi-sport events in Nepal
Sport in Kathmandu
South Asian Games